Three referendums were held simultaneously in Ireland on 25 November 1992, each on a proposed amendment of the Irish constitution. They were enumerated as the twelfth, thirteenth and fourteenth amendments.

The proposed twelfth and thirteenth amendments were held to reverse differing elements of the Supreme Court's decision in the X case in which the Supreme Court held that a risk of suicide by a pregnant woman could constitute a risk to her health which would justify an abortion, and that the courts had to power to grant an injunction preventing a pregnant woman from travelling abroad for an abortion. The fourteenth amendment also related to abortion and was introduced to reverse decision by the courts in the abortion information cases. In these cases — beginning with Attorney-General (Society for the Protection of the Unborn Child) v Open Door Counselling Ltd. — the courts had granted injunctions preventing individuals from distributing contact information for foreign abortion clinics.

The proposed twelfth amendment was rejected by the electorate while both the thirteenth and fourteenth passed.

Twelfth amendment

The Twelfth Amendment proposed that the possibility of suicide was not a sufficient threat to justify an abortion. The wording of the proposed amendment was:

The proposal was rejected.

Thirteenth amendment

The Thirteenth Amendment specifies that the prohibition of abortion would not limit freedom of travel from Ireland to other countries where a person might legally obtain an abortion. The wording of the proposed amendment was:

The proposal was approved.

Fourteenth amendment

The Fourteenth Amendment specifies that Irish citizens have the freedom to pursue and learn about abortion services in other countries. The wording of the proposed amendment was:

The proposal was approved.

See also
Constitutional amendment
Politics of the Republic of Ireland
History of the Republic of Ireland
X Case
Abortion in the Republic of Ireland

References

1992 in Irish law
1992 in Irish politics
1992 referendums
Ireland 1992
November 1992 events in Europe
Constitutional 1992